The tramway in Piran, a coastal town in Slovenian part of Istria, was in use from 20 July 1912 until 31 August 1953. The tramline replaced a pioneering trolleybus line in 1912, only to be replaced in turn by diesel buses in 1953.

It ran to the Piran railway station at Tartini Square. The closure of the railway line to Trieste in 1935 reduced passenger traffic on the tram line but it was not until 1953 that competing bus services made it uneconomical to retain. The building of the tramline in 1912 cost 150,000 Austro-Hungarian kronen.

The tram cars themselves were single-decked and fully enclosed. However a small number of attached trailers were also employed - enclosed for winter and open for summer.  In the early years of the service a freight trailer was also used. The electricity for the tram was produced by a plant at shipyard nearby Portorož.

Piran
Tram transport in Slovenia
1912 establishments in Austria-Hungary
1953 disestablishments in Europe
Piran